is a Japanese science fiction thriller film directed by Ishirō Honda, with special effects by Eiji Tsuburaya.

Plot

On a rainy night in the outskirts of Tokyo, a drug smuggler, Misaki, is killed while trying to escape in a getaway car, leaving only his clothes behind. The police go to his apartment to investigate, questioning his girlfriend, Arai Chikako, who says Misaki hasn't returned home for five days. Arai is a singer at a cabaret, and meets Masada, a Jyoto University professor, there.  She gives him a note to take to Misaki, but is confiscated and taken into custody by the police.  He theorizes to the police Misaki's disappearance is the result of his physical form melting away due to exposure to radiation in the rain that night.  The police dismisses the theory.

That night, Nishiyama of a drug smuggling gang sneaks into Arai's apartment and threatens her, asking her where Misaki is.  However, Arai doesn't know, and Nishiyama leaves by the window, followed by gunshots.  Arai screams and the police investigates, looking outside Arai's bedroom window and finding only a pile of clothes and a gun on the floor.

In the morning, the police take Arai in for questioning, but gets no new information from her. Masada arrives at the police station and invites Inspector Tominaga and Detective Sakata to his medical institute to hear the testimony of a group of fishermen, who allegedly witnessed some of their crew members fall victim to a liquid creature, disintegrating them and leaving their clothes behind.  Masada next shows the detectives the test effects of radiation poisoning the fishermen were exposed to on a frog. The frog melts almost immediately, all of its cells transforming into a liquid creature.

Arai later visits Masada and his superior, Dr. Maki, at the medical institute and tells him she also witnessed a man (Nishiyama) dissolving, leaving his clothes behind. Dr. Maki dubs this liquid creature the H-Man.  They go to the police station again with their findings and Arai's testimony, where she also agrees to lead police to the gang at the cabaret.  That night, the police goes to the cabaret and made arrests, but Uchida, one of the gangsters, is tipped off by the gangster waiter and retreats to dancer Emi's room. Once inside, the gangsters try to escape through the window, but the H-Man appears, dissolving the waiter and Emi, and later Detective Sakata.

Having witnessed the carnage, Inspector Tominaga and others devised a plan to use a high voltage discharge unit to stop the H-Men's infiltration upstream by lighting Tokyo's sewer system on fire.  Meanwhile, Uchida has kidnapped Arai and taken her into the sewers to retrieve the stash of drugs.  Masada finds a piece of Arai's clothing floating in the water and rushes into the sewers to rescue her. Uchida is killed by an H-Man, and Arai is rescued by Masada.  Both gets out of the sewer in time as the flames burn all the H-Men, ending their reign of terror.

Cast 
 Akihiko Hirata as Inspector Tominaga 
 Kenji Sahara as Dr. Masada
 Yumi Shirakawa as Chikako Arai  
 Makoto Satō as Uchida
 Korenari Senda as Dr. Maki 
 Yōsuke Natsuki
 Eitaro Ozawa as Inspector Miyashita 
 Hisaya Itō as Misaki

Production

Writing
The idea for The H-Man came from actor Hideo Unagami, who when acting in The Mysterians in 1957 wrote a story proposal called The Liquid Man Appears (液体人間現る, Ekitai Ningen Genru), about a liquid human created by the radiation from the hydrogen bomb. Producer Tomoyuki Tanaka read Unagami's story and he and Toho greenlit a script, but Unagami tragically died from a heart attack in November 1957.

After Hideo Unagami died, Takeshi Kimura was hired to adapt  Unagami's story into a screenplay, while Ishiro Honda was chosen as the director. Written in November 1957, this first draft titled The Liquid Men (液体人間, Ekitai Ningen), had the basic elements of the story which would remain intact. In Kimura's initial draft, the film's climax had the authorities plan to destroy the liquid monsters by electrifying a part of the Sumida River where the creatures live. When the plan fails, Kenji Sahara's heroic character Masuda volunteers to turn himself into one of the liquid men as a means of better understanding and defeating the enemy. But out of love, instead Chikako Arai sacrifices herself and is transformed into a liquid human and Masada is able to discover that the creatures are living in the sewers within the city where they could be eventually destroyed.

There was no fiery climax as in the finished film. The movie was originally envisioned as being in black and white, but after the success of Rodan (1956) in color it was decided to film the movie in color as well.

Takeshi Kimura wrote three more script drafts and changed the title to Beauty and the Liquid People. In the third draft, personalities of the main characters were developed a bit more deeply and Dr. Maki had a brother that was a board member of the company that owned the doom Ryujin-Maru II ship. This character was dropped. In the fourth and final draft, the Tokyo firestorm was added to the last scene and even after the final draft, minor changes and additions continued to be made throughout filming. The most important thing being added was Dr. Maki's explanation for how the liquid humans were created.

Special effects
While in its humanoid shape, the H-Man was portrayed by suit actor Haruo Nakajima. In order to depict the amorphous H-Man slithering across the ground in its liquid state, organic glass was used.

To make the H-Man slime go up walls, special sets were constructed to roll 60 degrees to give the effect that the deadly ooze was sliding up the walls.

Release
The H-Man was distributed theatrically in Japan by Toho on June 24, 1958. 
The film was released theatrically in the United States by Columbia Pictures with an English-language dub and 79-minute running time.

The original Japanese version of the film focuses a similar amount of time on the drug-running criminals as the activities of the H-Men. This was cut in the American film.

Columbia released The H-Man on VHS. The film was released on DVD in 2009 in the United States.

Reception
From contemporary reviews, A New York Herald Tribune film critic at the time called it, "A good-natured poke at atom-bomb tests[.] The picture is plainly making a case against the use of nuclear bombs. At the same time, there is a great deal of lively entertainment in the story involving police, dope smugglers, scientists and some very pretty Japanese girls."  The Daily Variety described the film as "well made" "seemingly more thoughtful" than The Mysterians and Gigantis. The review noted Takeshi Kumra's screenplay as "effective" and Honda's direction as taking "full advantage of the story [which is a] technically excellent production." The Monthly Film Bulletin noted the film had "all the usual faults and virtues of Japanese SF-cum-horror fiction[.] But for special effects, trick photography and spectacular staging, the Japanese again beat their Hollywood counterparts at their own game: The fantasy element of vanishing bodies and mobile liquid is brilliantly done."

References

Footnotes

Sources

 

 Ragone, August (2007, 2014) Eiji Tsuburaya: Master of Monsters San Francisco, CA: Chronicle Books. .

External links

 

 

Films directed by Ishirō Honda
1958 films
1950s science fiction horror films
1950s Japanese-language films
Toho tokusatsu films
1950s horror thriller films
1958 horror films
Films set in Tokyo
Films produced by Tomoyuki Tanaka
Films scored by Masaru Sato
Gangster films
Mafia films
Films set in the Pacific Ocean
Films set on ships
1950s English-language films
1950s Japanese films